Mara Belcheva (8 September 1868 – 16 March 1937) was a Bulgarian poet.

Life
Belcheva was born in Sevlievo.  Her father was a leader of the April uprising against the Ottoman Empire.  She graduated from secondary school in Veliko Tarnovo and went on to study at a women's school in Vienna.   She became a teacher and taught in Ruse and Sofia.

In 1886, she married Hristo Belčev, poet and economist who served as minister of finance under Prime Minister Stefan Stambolov.  An assassination attempt on Stambolov claimed the life of Belčev in 1891. (Stambolov himself was successfully assassinated in 1895.)

Tsar Ferdinand I was taken with Belcheva and kept a marble sculpture of her hand on his desk.   He wished her to serve as lady-in-waiting to his mother, Clémentine of Orléans, but she refused a life in the palace.

Belcheva went to Geneva to study philology.  In 1903 she began a relationship with poet Pencho Slaveykov which lasted until his death in 1912. They never married but referred to her as his "wife" throughout his writings.

Belcheva began publishing verse in 1907.  She published three collections of poetry: Na praga stûpki ("Footsteps on the Threshold", 1918), Soneti ("Sonnets", 1926), and Izbrani pesni ("Selected Songs", 1931).   She published a biography of Slaveykov in 1925.  She also translated Friedrich Nietzsche's Thus Spoke Zarathustra and Gerhart Hauptmann's Die versunkene Glocke into Bulgarian.

Honors
She and Slaveykov appear on the 50 lev banknote. Belcheva is the second named woman to appear on Bulgarian paper currency.

References

External links
 Books by Belcheva

1868 births
1937 deaths
Bulgarian poets
Bulgarian translators
Bulgarian writers
People from Sevlievo